Jennifer Frautschi is an American classical violinist, currently Artist-in-Residence at Stony Brook University. She plays an Antonio Stradivarius violin known as the "ex-Cadiz," dated to 1722 which a private American foundation gave to her on loan.

Biography 
Frautschi was born in Pasadena, California and began to play the violin at the age of three. At the Colburn School in Los Angeles she was a student of Robert Lipsett and later attended prestigious schools such as Harvard University, the New England Conservatory, and the Juilliard School, where she studied under Robert Mann. She later received an Avery Fisher career grant and appeared as a soloist with Pierre Boulez and the Los Angeles Philharmonic, Christoph Eschenbach and the Chicago Symphony Orchestra at the Ravinia Festival and has soloed with the Chamber Orchestra of Philadelphia, Cincinnati Symphony Orchestra, Kansas City Symphony, Louisville Orchestra, San Diego Symphony, Seattle Symphony.

In 2004, Frautschi made her recital debut at Carnegie Hall in New York City. In Europe she has appeared in world-class classical musical venues such as the Wigmore Hall in London, Mozarteum in Salzburg, Concertgebouw in Amsterdam, Konzerthaus, Vienna, and Cité de la Musique in Paris. She has also played with various operas and festivals around the globe including Beijing's Imperial Garden, La Monnaie Opera in Brussels, La Chaux-de-Fonds in Switzerland, and San Miguel de Allende Festival in Mexico.

In 2008-09 she toured America for three weeks with the Czech National Symphony Orchestra, playing composers such as Mendelssohn and Bruch. In 2010–2011 she performed with the Rhode Island Philharmonic Orchestra and the Phoenix Symphony and toured England with musicians from Prussia Cove, appearing again at the Wigmore Hall.

Frautschi has released three records for Artek including an orchestral debut recording of the Prokofiev concerti with Gerard Schwarz and the Seattle Symphony, and Naxos, including a recording of Schoenberg's Concerto for String Quartet and Orchestra, which earned a Grammy nomination, and the Stravinsky Violin Concerto with the Philharmonia Orchestra of London.

Reception 
The Kansas City Star said of her performance, "Frautschi possesses a lush, florid tone, a sure musical sense and a forthright knowledge of where she wants to go with any given phrase".

Personal life 
Frautschi loves the Sanrio character Badtz Maru. Her father is the theoretical physicist Steven Frautschi.

References

External links 
 

American classical violinists
Living people
Year of birth missing (living people)
Musicians from Pasadena, California
Harvard University alumni
Juilliard School alumni
New England Conservatory alumni
Classical musicians from California
21st-century classical violinists
Women classical violinists